Ben or Benjamin Collins may refer to:

 Benjamin Collins (Kent cricketer) (1820–1903), English cricketer
 Benjamin Collins (Cambridge University cricketer) (born 1977), English cricketer
 Ben Collins (American football) (1921–2014), American football player and coach
 Ben Collins (racing driver) (born 1975), English racing car driver, "The Stig" on TV series Top Gear
 Ben Collins (soccer, born 1961), retired Liberian soccer midfielder
 Ben Collins (soccer, born 2000), Australian soccer player
 Ben Collins (writer), American screenwriter
 Ben Collins, guitarist in the band Lightning Love
 Ben Collins, guitarist in the band Chronic Future

See also
 Benjamin Collins Brodie (disambiguation)
 Collins (surname)